Euthiconus is a genus of beetles belonging to the family Staphylinidae.

The species of this genus are found in Europe and Northern America.

Species:
 Euthiconus conicicollis (Fairmaire & Laboulbène, 1855) 
 Euthiconus latus (Brendel, 1893)

References

Staphylinidae
Staphylinidae genera